Evan Philip Exelby (12 October 1905 – 6 June 1981) was a New Zealand lawn bowls player.

Bowls career
At the 1950 British Empire Games in Auckland he won the men's pairs gold medal with Robert Henry.

In 1947, Exelby won the New Zealand National Bowls Championships pairs title with William Ransford "Rance" Hawkins, representing the Frankton club. Exelby died on 6 June 1981, and was buried at Hamilton Park Cemetery.

References

1905 births
1981 deaths
New Zealand male bowls players
Commonwealth Games gold medallists for New Zealand
Bowls players at the 1950 British Empire Games
Burials at Hamilton Park Cemetery
Commonwealth Games medallists in lawn bowls
20th-century New Zealand people
Medallists at the 1950 British Empire Games